Ascorbyl palmitate is an ester formed from ascorbic acid and palmitic acid creating a fat-soluble form of vitamin C.  In addition to its use as a source of vitamin C, it is also used as an antioxidant food additive (E number E304). It is approved for use as a food additive in the EU, the U.S., Canada, Australia, and New Zealand.

Ascorbyl palmitate is also marketed as "vitamin C ester". It is synthesized by acylation vitamin C using different acyl donors.

See also
Ascorbyl stearate
Vitamin C
Mineral ascorbates

References

External links
 Bioavailability of Different Forms of Vitamin C (Ascorbic Acid)
 Information from the Linus Pauling Institute
 

Food antioxidants
Fatty acid esters
Palmitate esters
E-number additives
Vitamin C